Paris Qui Dort (literally "Paris which sleeps") is a 1924 French science fiction comedy silent feature film (65 minutes) directed by René Clair. Also released as Le rayon de la mort (55 minutes), its international English-language titles were The Crazy Ray and Paris Asleep (usually 55 minutes). It has also been released in the USA as a 35 minute short subject called At 3:25. by Red Seal Pictures.

Plot summary 
The film is about a mad doctor who uses a magic ray on citizens which causes them to freeze in strange and often embarrassing positions. People who are unaffected by the ray begin to loot Paris.

Cast 
Henri Rollan as Albert
Charles Martinelli as The scientist
Louis Pré Fils as the detective
Albert Préjean as The pilot
Madeleine Rodrigue as Hesta, the airline passenger
Myla Seller as The niece / daughter of the scientist
Antoine Stacquet as The rich man
Marcel Vallée as the thief

Home media 
The film is available on the Region 1 Criterion DVD release of another Clair film, Under the Roofs of Paris (1930). It is also available for free at the Internet Archive.

See also 
 1924 in science fiction

External links 

1924 films
French science fiction comedy films
French silent short films
1920s French-language films
French black-and-white films
Films directed by René Clair
Films set in Paris
Mad scientist films
1920s science fiction comedy films
1924 comedy films
Silent comedy films
Silent horror films
1920s French films
Silent science fiction films